The men's tandem sprint B at the 2022 Commonwealth Games is part of the cycling programme, and took place on 31 July 2022.

Records
Prior to this competition, the existing world and Games records were as follows:

Schedule
The schedule is as follows:

All times are British Summer Time (UTC+1)

Results

Qualifying
Top 4 riders qualify for Semi-Finals.

Semifinals
The winners race for the gold and silver medals. The losers race for third place.

Finals
The final classification is determined in the medal finals.

References

 

Cycling at the Commonwealth Games – Men's tandem sprint B
Men's tandem sprint B